Terry Canales is a Democratic member of the Texas House of Representatives, serving since 2013. Terry Canales was born in Hidalgo County and is a native of South Texas. He was elected to the House of Representatives in 2012 to represent District 40, which encompasses the heart of Hidalgo County.  The cities within District 40 include Edinburg (Hidalgo County Seat), Elsa, North Pharr, San Carlos, La Blanca, Faysville, and portions of McAllen and Weslaco.

Biography
Terry Canales earned his Juris Doctor by the age of 24. Following in the footsteps of his father Terry A. Canales, a former State District Judge, and his uncle Arnulfo Gonzalez Jr., Canales graduated from St. Mary's University School of Law. Upon passing the Texas State Bar Exam, Canales opened his own law practice in Edinburg, Texas. He specializes in Oil and Gas litigation, Criminal Defense, Personal Injury, Family Law, Real Estate, and Municipal Law.

His father, Terry A. Canales, was the first Hispanic state representative to represent Jim Wells County, serving from 1973 to 1977. His sister Gabriella "Gabi" Canales served from 2002 to 2004. He is also the sixth member of his extended family to serve in the Texas House of Representatives. Perhaps the most recognized of Rep. Canales' family is his great uncle, José Tomás Canales, a Brownsville Democrat who served a total of five terms between 1905 and 1921. He was a founding member of the League of United Latin American Citizens (LULAC), and is most famous for defending the Hispanic community against the injustices perpetrated by the Texas Rangers.

Legislative committees
Canales is currently serving as a member of the following committees:
Criminal Jurisprudence, Member
Energy Resources, Member
Water Desalination, Member

Election history

2012

References

External links
 
Legislative page
 Official website

Living people
Democratic Party members of the Texas House of Representatives
Hispanic and Latino American state legislators in Texas
1979 births
People from Edinburg, Texas
St. Mary's University School of Law alumni
21st-century American politicians